Louise Sarazin, Louise Sarazin-Levassor, (November 6, 1847, Foix, † 16 October 1916, Paris), played a significant role in early automotive history having been party to its beginnings in France and Germany. She was the wife of Edouard Sarazin, an entrepreneurial Belgian industrialist and patents lawyer who was in a mix of automotive partnerships and agencies with Émile Levassor, René Panhard, John Cockerill, Deutz AG, Gottlieb Daimler and Wilhelm Maybach. In 1884 Sarazin acquired the licence to build Deutz engines in France, which he duly contracted to Perin, Panhard & Cie in Paris. Around 1886 he similarly acquired licences to build Daimler engines in France and started to commission Panhard & Levassor in Paris. After his death in 1887 his widow Louise developed the business relationships and negotiated the partnerships with Daimler and 'Panhard et Levassor'. In 1890 she married Emile Levassor.

Early life 
Louise Cayrol was born in 1847 in Foix, in the département of Ariège in southern France. Her parents were Antoine Cayrol and Jeanne Cayrol (nee Bonnafous), and her sister was named Anne.

In 1870, in Paris, she married Edouard Sarazin, a patents lawyer from Liège, Belgium, and they had three children, including a daughter Jeanne in 1878 and a son Auguste Henri born in Asnières-sur-Seine in 1880.

Automotive industry

Edouard Sarazin was an entrepreneurial industrialist, patents lawyer and pioneer of automotive engineering, who was in a mix of automotive partnerships and agencies with Émile Levassor, John Cockerill, Deutz AG, and Gottlieb Daimler. In 1884 Sarazin, the representative of the German company Gasmotorenfabrik Otto & Langen (Deutz AG) acquired the licence to build Deutz engines in France, which he duly contracted to Perin, Panhard & Cie in Paris. Around 1886/7 he similarly acquired licences to build Daimler engines in France, and to conform to French Patent Law he commissioned Panhard & Levassor to produce "some" Daimler engines in Paris. His untimely death in 1887 left his widow to develop the business relationships and complete the partnership with Daimler. On February 5, 1889, she signed a contract in which Daimler received 12% of the sales price of all engines produced in France and she received 20% from Panhard & Levassor.

Death-bed wish
Sarazin's deathbed words to his wife were: "In your own interests, and for the good of our children, I recommend that you maintain the business connection with Daimler. His invention is entirely trustworthy, and it will have a future, the magnitude of which we cannot begin to imagine today."

He also asked that she maintain the relationship with Levassor and Panhard.  To wit ...

Levassor

In May 1890 Mme. Louise Sarazin married Emile Levassor.

During the 1896 Paris–Marseille–Paris race, he swerved to avoid a dog, crashed and was seriously injured. He never fully recovered and died in Paris the following year.

Literature 
 Reinhard Seiffert: Die Ära Gottlieb Daimlers. Neue Perspektiven zur Frühgeschichte des Automobils und seiner Technik. Vieweg+Teubner, Wiesbaden 2009, ISBN 978-3-8348-0962-9.
 Reinhard Seiffert: The era of Gottlieb Daimler. New perspectives on the early history of the automobile and its technology. Vieweg + Teubner, Wiesbaden 2009, ISBN 978-3-8348-0962-9 .

See also
 De Boisse, part-owned by Levassor / Sarazin

References

External links 
 French Motorcycles - Levassor and De Boisse.
 History Garage.com - Emile Levassor.
 Daimler.com - Louise Sarazin and Bertha Benz. Two women with "Gasoline in the Blood" 
Reinhard Seiffert: The era of Gottlieb Daimler.
 John Cockerill and Co (Grace's guide) 
 The Motor Museum in Miniature - Louise Sarazin-Levassor. 
 The Pit-crew Online. The Inventor, An Engine, A Love Story. 
 James M. Laux: In First Gear. The French automobile industry to 1914. McGill-Queen's University Press, Montreal 1976, ISBN 0-7735-0264-5. Pages 10,11,14,16.

1847 births
1916 deaths
Daimler vehicles
French automotive pioneers
People associated with the internal combustion engine
People from Foix
19th-century French businesspeople
Panhard vehicles